The 1979 United Kingdom general election saw the Conservative Party win the most votes and seats in England. They received 12.26 million English votes, a record at the time.

References

1979 in Scotland
1970s elections in Scotland
1979
England